The canton of Saint-Étienne-en-Dévoluy is a former administrative division in southeastern France. It was disbanded following the French canton reorganisation which came into effect in March 2015. It consisted of the 4 communes Agnières-en-Dévoluy, La Cluse, Saint-Disdier and Saint-Étienne-en-Dévoluy until 2013, when these communes merged into the new commune Dévoluy, which joined the canton of Veynes in 2015. It had 1,013 inhabitants (2012).

Demographics

See also
Cantons of the Hautes-Alpes department

References

Former cantons of Hautes-Alpes
2015 disestablishments in France
States and territories disestablished in 2015